Kullervo Achilles Manner (Russian Куллерво Густавович Маннер, Kullervo Gustavovich Manner; 12 October 1880 – 15 January 1939) was a Finnish politician and journalist, and later a Soviet politician.  He was a member of the Finnish parliament, serving as its Speaker in 1917. He was also chairman of the Social Democratic Party of Finland between 1917 and 1918. During the Finnish Civil War, he led the Finnish People's Delegation, a leftist alternative to the established Finnish government. After the war, he escaped to the Soviet Union, where he co-founded the Finnish Communist Party. It is said if the Red Guards had won the Civil War, Manner might have risen to the position of the "Leader of the Red Finland".

Early life

Manner was born a minister's son in Kokemäki. His father Gustaf Manner worked in various parishes, including those of Lappi and Vampula. Kullervo's mother was Alma Limón, daughter of pastor Johannes Limón. After graduating from high school in 1900, Manner worked as a journalist in Porvoo and later in Helsinki. In 1906 he founded a newspaper called Työläinen (meaning "worker") in Porvoo, of which he was the editor-in-chief until 1909; an article published in the newspaper in 1909 brought him the following year, already as a Member of Parliament, a six-month prison sentence for a lèse majesté (a lesser crime similar to treason) against Nicholas II in 1911. He was elected to the Finnish Parliament as a Social Democrat from Uusimaa in 1910 and 1917. He was appointed Speaker of the Parliament in 1917. Manner's brother  was governor of Viipuri and Kymi provinces from the 1920s to the 1950s.

Manner married Olga Arjanne (Seger until 1906) on October 26, 1908, at the local register office of Porvoo. From 1906 they worked at the same time in the Työläinen'''s editorial office and lived in the house where the editorial office was located.

 Civil War 

On 28 January 1918, during the Finnish Civil War, Manner was appointed Chairman of the Finnish People's Delegation. On 10 April the same year, Manner was appointed commander-in-chief of the Red Guards as well as head of state of its short-lived government, The People's Deputation. He was given dictatorial powers. At the time, the Red Guards led by Manner ruled for several months in Helsinki and other southern cities, while the White Guards led by General Mannerheim and the Senate had control of northern Finland.

 In the USSR 

After the Civil War, Manner fled to Soviet Russia where he became the second chairman of the Finnish Communist Party after Yrjö Sirola. He also became an official of the Comintern.  In the 1930s, Manner and his wife Hanna Malm fell out of favor with Otto Wille Kuusinen. Manner was dismissed from most of his duties in May 1934. He continued to work as a Comintern rapporteur on Latin American affairs until July 1935.

Imprisonment and death
In 1935, Manner was arrested and sentenced to ten years hard labor. Manner was taken to a Gulag labor camp in Ukhta-Pechora in Komi Republic, where he died on 15 January 1939. The official cause of death was tuberculosis. According to professor of history Alexander Popov, the real cause of death could be attributed to radiation sickness, which Manner could have received, since he worked with water containing radium.

Rehabilitation
Manner was rehabilitated in 1962.

Political and military offices

|-

|-

See also

 Eero Haapalainen
 Otto Wille Kuusinen
 Red Finland

Sources
 Veli-Pekka Leppänen: Herraspojan harharetki päättyi joukkohautaan Uralilla (in Finnish) – Helsingin Sanomat'', July 18, 2017. Retrieved September 27, 2021.

References

1880 births
1939 deaths
People from Kokemäki
People from Turku and Pori Province (Grand Duchy of Finland)
Leaders of the Social Democratic Party of Finland
Communist Party of Finland politicians
Leaders of political parties
Speakers of the Parliament of Finland
Members of the Parliament of Finland (1910–11)
Members of the Parliament of Finland (1911–13)
Members of the Parliament of Finland (1913–16)
Members of the Parliament of Finland (1916–17)
Members of the Parliament of Finland (1917–19)
Finnish People's Delegation members
Finnish emigrants to the Soviet Union
Finnish journalists
Comintern people
Executive Committee of the Communist International
Great Purge victims from Finland
Finnish people who died in prison custody
Prisoners who died in Soviet detention
20th-century deaths from tuberculosis
Soviet rehabilitations
Tuberculosis deaths in the Soviet Union
Tuberculosis deaths in Russia